Opera is the first compilation album of opera arias by Italian tenor Andrea Bocelli. The album was released only in the United Kingdom and appeared on the album charts of the UK and Ireland.

Background
The album is a compilation of arias from Bocelli's previously recorded Classical albums.

Track listing

Commercial performance
The album debuted at No. 10 on the UK Albums Chart, following Bocelli's performance of "Nessun dorma" on the Strictly Come Dancing results show the day before. With 14,577 copies sold, it became Bocelli's 16th Top 40 album and seventh Top 10 entry since his 1997 breakthrough, Romanza, while lifting his career sales to a 4,964,058 total in the United Kingdom.

Weekly charts

Year-end charts

References

Andrea Bocelli compilation albums
2012 compilation albums
2012 classical albums